William Ambrose Bebb (4 July 1894 – 27 April 1955) was a Welsh language critic, author and politician.

Ambrose Bebb was the son of diarist Edward Hughes Bebb, and the father of noted Welsh rugby international Dewi Bebb. The family came from Cardiganshire.

A co-founder of Plaid Cymru, Bebb took a keen interest in politics and was influenced by Charles Maurras of the Action Française movement. With the outbreak of the Second World War, Bebb became a vocal proponent of the War Effort against Nazi Germany, and considered Germany's total defeat "essential". In the 1945 General Election Mr Bebb stood for the Plaid Cymru in the seat of Caernarvonshire, and came in third place.

Ambrose Bebb was the grandfather of Conservative Party Member of Parliament (MP) for Aberconwy, Guto Bebb.

Works
Llydaw (1929)
Ein Hen Hen Hanes
Llywodraeth y Cestyll (1934)
Crwydro'r Cyfandir (1936)
Y Ddeddf Uno 1536 (1937)
Cyfnod y Tuduriaid (1939)
Dydd-lyfr Pythefnos neu Y Ddawns Angau
1940 Lloffion o  Ddyddiadur
Y Baradwys Bell (1941)
Pererindoddau (1941)
Dyddlyfr 1941
Gadael Tir 
Dial y Tir (1945)
Calendr Coch (1946)
Machlud yr Oesoedd Canol (1951)
Machlud y Mynachlogydd
Yr Argyfwng

Notes

References
 Meils, Gareth (May 1977) "Ambrose Bebb" Planet Gwasg Gomer, Llangeitho, Tregaron, Cardiganshire, Wales, 37/38: pp. 70–79.

1894 births
1955 deaths
20th-century Welsh historians
Welsh-speaking politicians
Ambrose